Field Marshal Sir Francis Wogan Festing,  (Mandarin: 菲士廷, fēi shì tíng; 28 August 1902 – 3 August 1976) was a senior British Army officer. His most important posts were as Commander of British Forces in Hong Kong (1945–46 and 1949), General Officer Commanding (GOC) British Troops in Egypt (1952), GOC Eastern Command (1954), Commander-in-Chief Far East Land Forces (1956), and Chief of the Imperial General Staff (1958–61). He saw active service in the Second World War, taking a prominent role in Operation Ironclad (the Battle of Madagascar) and the Arakan offensive of the Burma campaign, and later advised the British government on ending conscription and reducing the size of the army by fifteen battalions.

Early life and military career
Festing was born in Dublin, Ireland, the son of Brigadier General Francis Leycester Festing and Charlotte Katherine Grindall Festing (née Festing). He was educated at Winchester College and the Royal Military College, Sandhurst, Festing was commissioned into 3rd Battalion the Rifle Brigade on 23 December 1921. He was promoted to lieutenant on 23 December 1923 and became aide-de-camp to General Sir John Burnett-Stuart in 1926. He went on to be Air Liaison Officer for Eastern Command on 1 February 1936 and, after attending the Staff College, Camberley from 1933 to 1934, and having been promoted to captain on 1 September 1936, joined the staff at the War Office on 15 February 1938 before being promoted to major on 23 December 1938. In February 1939 he returned to the Staff College, Camberley, this time to serve as an instructor, a post he held until December 1939, three months after the Second World War began.

Second World War

In the Second World War Festing was air liaison officer for the expedition to Norway of 1940, then, having been promoted to acting lieutenant colonel in April 1940, as a staff officer in the Operations Directorate at the War Office from May 1940. In September 1940 he became Commanding Officer of the 2nd Battalion East Lancashire Regiment and then in April 1942 he became Commander of 29th Independent Infantry Brigade Group which was the landing force of Force 121 for Operation Ironclad, the seizure of Vichy French ports and airfields in the Indian Ocean, notably Diego Suárez, Majunga and Tamatave in Madagascar. He was awarded the Distinguished Service Order (DSO) for his services in this campaign.

In November 1942 Festing took command of the 36th Indian Division and at the beginning of 1944 led it in the final stages of the Arakan offensive of the Burma campaign. In mid-1944 the division moved to Northern Burma as part of the US led Northern Combat Area Command before rejoining 14th Army. Festing had a reputation as a front line soldier as illustrated by one quote of an event on 29 October 1944: 

Festing was mentioned in despatches on 5 April 1945, appointed a Commander of the Order of the British Empire on 5 July, and appointed a Companion of the Order of the Bath on 6 June 1946; all in recognition of his services in Burma. He was also awarded the Legion of Merit in the Degree of Commander by the President of the United States for his conduct throughout the war on 8 November 1945.

Postwar career
Festing was appointed Commander of British Forces in Hong Kong from August 1945 and, then having been promoted to major general on 17 August 1946, he returned to the UK to be Director of Weapons and Development at the War Office in February 1947 where he remained until 26 June 1949 and then returned to Hong Kong. After recovering from a blood clot on the brain, he was appointed President of the Regular Commissions Board on 1 October 1950 and became Assistant Chief of Staff (Organisation and Training) at Supreme Headquarters Allied Powers in Europe on 1 April 1951. He took part in the funeral procession on 11 February 1952 following the death of King George VI and was appointed a Knight Commander of the Order of the British Empire in the Queen's Birthday Honours 1952.

Promoted to lieutenant general on 6 February 1952, Festing became General Officer Commanding British Troops in Egypt in April 1952 and then General Officer Commanding Eastern Command on 1 July 1954 and, having been advanced to Knight Commander of the Order of the Bath in the New Year Honours 1956, he became Commander-in-Chief Far East Land Forces in August 1956. Promoted to general on 29 November 1956, advanced to Knight Grand Cross of the Order of the Bath in the Queen's Birthday Honours 1957 and, having been appointed aide-de-camp general to the Queen on 26 June 1958, he became Chief of the Imperial General Staff on 29 September 1958. In this capacity he advised the British Government on ending conscription and reducing the size of the army by fifteen battalions. Having been promoted to field marshal on 1 September 1960, he retired on 1 November 1961.

Festing was also Honorary Colonel of the 50th (Northumberland) Machine Gun Battalion of the Royal Northumberland Fusiliers from 1 February 1948, Colonel Commandant of the Royal Northumberland Fusiliers from 12 March 1953, Colonel Commandant of the 3rd Green Jackets, The Rifle Brigade from 7 November 1958 and Colonel Commandant of the 3rd Battalion The Royal Green Jackets from 15 June 1968.

In retirement Festing became a Deputy Lieutenant of Northumberland. His interests included early firearms and Japanese swords. He was a practising Roman Catholic. He died at his home at Tarset near Hexham in Northumberland on 3 August 1976.

Family
In 1937, Festing married Mary Cecilia ( Riddell, elder daughter of Cuthbert David Giffard Riddell, of Swinburne Castle, Northumberland), from an old recusant family. The couple had four sons:
Fra' Matthew Festing (former Prince and Grand Master of the Sovereign Military Order of Malta), John Festing (former High Sheriff of Northumberland), Major Michael Festing and Andrew Festing (former President of the Royal Society of Portrait Painters).

References

Bibliography

External links

Generals of World War II

|-

|-

|-

|-

|-

|-

1902 births
1976 deaths
People educated at West Downs School
People educated at Winchester College
Converts to Roman Catholicism
British field marshals
British Army generals of World War II
English Roman Catholics
Francis
Commanders of Hong Kong
Companions of the Distinguished Service Order
Graduates of the Royal Military College, Sandhurst
Hong Kong soldiers
Knights Commander of the Order of the British Empire
Knights Grand Cross of the Order of the Bath
Knights of Malta
Rifle Brigade officers
Deputy Lieutenants of Northumberland
Chiefs of the Imperial General Staff
Commanders of the Legion of Merit
Graduates of the Staff College, Camberley
Military personnel from Northumberland
Academics of the Staff College, Camberley
War Office personnel in World War II
Military personnel from Dublin (city)